Det Sande Ansigt (English translation: The True Face) is a 1951 Danish film directed by Bodil Ipsen and Lau Lauritzen Jr., written by Johannes Allen, and based upon the novel by Gerhard Rasmussen. The film received the Bodil Award for Best Danish Film of the Year.

Plot
Troels Rolff, a young architect (played by Lau Lauritzen Jr.), is questioned as a suspect for the rape and murder of a 10-year-old girl. He pleads his innocence, and yet he is unable to explain what he was doing the day of the murder. Rolff's world breaks apart as those closest to him – his wife, his father, his pastor and his friends—react to his arrest with varying degrees of suspicion. Even when cleared of the charges, the question remains if he can ever return to his former life of joy and innocence.

Cast
Lau Lauritzen Jr. as Troels Rolff
Johannes Meyer as Pastor Mikael Rolff
Lisbeth Movin as Troels' Girlfriend Sonja
Ib Schønberg as Editor
Grethe Thordahl as Troels' Wife
Oluf Bang as Troels' Father
Jørn Jeppesen
Einar Juhl
Emil Hass Christensen
Jakob Nielsen
Elsa Albeck
Poul Müller
Louis Miehe-Renard
Carl Heger
Per Buckhøj

References

External links

Det Sande Ansigt Danish Film Institute 

1951 films
Danish crime films
1950s Danish-language films
Films directed by Bodil Ipsen
Films directed by Lau Lauritzen Jr.
Films scored by Sven Gyldmark
1951 crime films
Danish black-and-white films
Best Danish Film Bodil Award winners